The South African Railways Class NG G14 2-6-2+2-6-2 of 1931 was an articulated narrow gauge steam locomotive.

In 1931, the South African Railways (SAR) placed a single lightweight Class  Garratt articulated steam locomotive with a  Double Prairie type wheel arrangement in service.

Manufacturer
A single narrow gauge Garratt locomotive was built for the South African Railways by Hannoversche Maschinenbau AG (Hanomag) in 1930. It was very similar to, but slightly larger and heavier than the Class NG G12 of 1927, the smallest Garratt to ever enter service on the SAR. Upon delivery, it was designated Class NG G14 and numbered NG84.

Characteristics
The Class NG G14 locomotive had a 2-6-2+2-6-2 Double Prairie type wheel arrangement like all the previous and subsequent narrow gauge SAR Garratts except the first, the 2-6-0+0-6-2 Double Mogul type Class NG G11. It was very similar in dimensions to the earlier Class NG G12, but it had cylinders with a  larger bore which not only resulted in more power, but also an increase in axle loading. Like the Class NG G12, it also had an outside plate frame, a round-topped firebox and was superheated. Its piston valves were actuated by Walschaerts valve gear.

Service
The Class NG G14 was placed in service on the narrow gauge line from Fort Beaufort to Seymour, where it became stable mate to Class NG G12 no. NG57. Its service life was similar to that of no. NG57, both being occasionally temporarily assigned to narrow gauge branch lines in other areas of the country to meet seasonal demands on those lines.

In 1940, when the Seymour branch was regauged to Cape gauge, the Class NG G14 and Class NG G12 no. NG57 were both transferred to the Kakamas branch, where they joined Class NG G12 no. NG56 working out of Upington. All three remained there until 1949, when the Kakamas line was also widened to Cape Gauge and they were transferred to South West Africa for a brief period.

From there, the Class NG G14 was allocated to Humewood Road in Port Elizabeth where it remained until it was withdrawn from service in 1952.

References

2670
2670
2-6-2+2-6-2 locomotives
Hanomag locomotives
Garratt locomotives
2 ft gauge locomotives
Railway locomotives introduced in 1931
1931 in South Africa
Scrapped locomotives